Sauk Rapids Township is a township in Benton County, Minnesota, United States near the  Mississippi River. The population was 584 at the 2010 census.

History
Sauk Rapids Township was organized in 1854. It was named for nearby rapids on the Mississippi River.

Geography

It is only about one-third the size of a normal (36-section) township, being bounded on the west by the Mississippi River. The east three-quarters of the city of Sartell, the northwest edge of the city of St. Cloud, and the north half of the city of Sauk Rapids are within this township geographically but are separate entities.

Major highway
  U.S. Highway 10

Lakes
 Unnamed Lake

Adjacent townships
 Watab Township (north)
 Mayhew Lake Township (northeast)
 Minden Township (east)
 Le Sauk Township, Stearns County (west)

Cemeteries
The township contains four cemeteries: Benton, Pioneer Benton County, Sacred Heart and Trinity.

Demographics
As of the census of 2000, there were 723 people, 270 households, and 201 families residing in the township. The racial makeup of the township was 98.34% White, 0.28% African American, 0.14% Native American, 0.55% Asian, 0.28% from other races, and 0.41% from two or more races. Hispanic or Latino of any race were 0.28% of the population.

There were 270 households, out of which 37.0% had children under the age of 18 living with them, 63.7% were married couples living together, 5.9% had a female householder with no husband present, and 25.2% were non-families. 15.6% of all households were made up of individuals, and 5.2% had someone living alone who was 65 years of age or older.  The average household size was 2.68 and the average family size was 3.07.

In the township the population was spread out, with 27.0% under the age of 18, 10.9% from 18 to 24, 28.2% from 25 to 44, 24.8% from 45 to 64, and 9.1% who were 65 years of age or older.  The median age was 36 years. For every 100 females, there were 98.6 males.  For every 100 females age 18 and over, there were 95.6 males.

The median income for a household in the township was $61,161, and the median income for a family was $67,500. Males had a median income of $39,750 versus $24,554 for females. The per capita income for the township was $24,421.  About 3.4% of families and 2.2% of the population were below the poverty line, including 0.5% of those under age 18 and 3.2% of those age 65 or over.

References
 United States National Atlas
 United States Census Bureau 2007 TIGER/Line Shapefiles
 United States Board on Geographic Names (GNIS)

External links
Sauk Rapids and Benton County - Images of America Series

Townships in Benton County, Minnesota
St. Cloud, Minnesota metropolitan area
Townships in Minnesota